Atrium Health Pineville (Formerly Mercy Hospital South, later Carolinas Medical Center-Pineville) is a 235 bed acute care facility located in Charlotte, North Carolina.  The hospital was opened in 1987 by the Sisters of Mercy to serve the rapidly growing southern part of Mecklenburg County.  in 1995, the Sisters of Mercy sold the hospital to Carolinas HealthCare System, now Atrium Health.  Atrium Health Pineville is a facility of Atrium Health, one of the nation's largest publicly owned, not-for-profit hospital operators.

References

External links 
 Atrium Health Pineville Homepage

Atrium Health
Hospitals in Charlotte, North Carolina